Lexicon is the seventh studio album by British singer Will Young. It was released on 21 June 2019 through Cooking Vinyl. The album's lead single "All the Songs" was released on 22 March 2019 and, with it, announced a supporting 21-date UK tour lasting throughout the month of October.

Background
The album has been said to reunite the team who executive produced his 2011 studio album Echoes. Furthermore, the album reunites him with Richard X, who produced his 2011 single "Jealousy", and Eg White, who co-wrote his 2003 single "Leave Right Now". Additionally, it is said to feature a track written by BRIT-award-winning singer-songwriter Tom Walker.

Critical reception

Commenting on Young's decision to release Lexicon with Cooking Vinyl, Elizabeth Aubrey wrote in the review for Evening Standard: "The freedom it has brought certainly suits him. Lexicon has darker, electronic underpinning than anything he’s done before [...] The project sees Young collaborating with other songwriters for the first time since his third album. He has boldly overhauled his sound and stayed true to his pop roots." musicOMH editor Helen Clarke described Lexicon as "a record for wallowing in after a break-up. It’s melodramatic [...] but it mostly feels a bit filler-y. Luckily for him, in the days of streaming and downloads, those opening tracks will be plenty to re-stoke the public’s love of Will Young, and hopefully provide a grounding for his next record. Electro Will is in there somewhere – as 2011's "Jealousy" proved – and we can't wait to hear from him again." Quentin Harrison, writing for Albumism, felt that "loosely defined as a sort of glossary for exceptional language or knowledge, it was wise for Will Young to elect “lexicon” as a designation for an album that manages to look back while moving forward with mature, compellingly rendered pop pieces."

Track listing

Charts

Release history

References

Will Young albums
2019 albums